is a Japanese skeleton racer. He is a participant at the 2014 Winter Olympics in Sochi.

References

External links
 

1984 births
Living people
Japanese male skeleton racers
Olympic skeleton racers of Japan
Skeleton racers at the 2014 Winter Olympics
Skeleton racers at the 2018 Winter Olympics
20th-century Japanese people
21st-century Japanese people